The mixed (or "open") ISSF 50 meter pistol was a competition at the 1972 Summer Olympics. It was held on 27 August 1972 at Schießanlage in Munich. There were 59 competitors from 36 nations. Nations had been limited to two shooters each since the 1952 Games.

The defending champion was Grigory Kosykh of the Soviet Union, who also held the world record with 572. He would not be a factor at these Games as he struggled and finished a distant eighth. The gold medal was won by Ragnar Skanåker who brought Sweden its first shooting gold medal in 36 years. Skanåker became a common sight at Olympic Games as he competed continuously thru 1996, appearing in seven Olympics. Daniel Iuga earned Romania's first medal in the event with his silver, while Rudolf Dollinger earned Austria's first with his bronze.

Background

This was the 13th appearance of the ISSF 50 meter pistol event. The event was held at every Summer Olympics from 1896 to 1920 (except 1904, when no shooting events were held) and from 1936 to 2016; it was open to women from 1968 to 1980. 1896 and 1908 were the only Games in which the distance was not 50 metres; the former used 30 metres and the latter 50 yards.

Four of the top 10 shooters from the 1968 Games returned: gold medalist Grigory Kosykh of the Soviet Union, silver medalist Heinz Mertel of West Germany, bronze medalist Harald Vollmar of East Germany, and tenth-place finisher Vladimir Stolypin of the Soviet Union. Stolypin had been the 1962 and 1966 world champion, but Vollmar was the champion in 1970. Dencho Denev of Bulgaria and Hynek Hromada of Czechoslovakia had finished second and third, respectively, to both Stolypin in 1966 and Vollmar in 1970; they were competing at the Olympics again seeking better results than in 1968, when neither made the top 10.

Albania, Belize (then British Honduras), Bolivia, and the Virgin Islands each made their debut in the event. The United States made its 12th appearance, most of any nation, having missed only the 1900 event.

Skanåker used a TsKIB SOO MЦ55.

Competition format

Each shooter fired 60 shots, in 6 series of 10 shots each, at a distance of 50 metres. The target was round, 50 centimetres in diameter, with 10 scoring rings. Scoring for each shot was up to 10 points, in increments of 1 point. The maximum score possible was 600 points. Any pistol was permitted.

Ties were broken by the best score in the sixth series, if still tied best score in fifth series, this continues until the tie is broken.

Records

Prior to this competition, the existing world and Olympic records were as follows.

Ragnar Skanåker beat the Olympic record by five points. Daniel Iuga, in second place, matched the old record.

Schedule

Results

References

External links
Sports reference
Official report pg. 226

Shooting at the 1972 Summer Olympics
Men's 1972